Lectionary 175, designated by siglum ℓ 175 (in the Gregory-Aland numbering) is a Greek manuscript of the New Testament, on paper. Paleographically it has been assigned to the 15th century. 
Formerly it was labelled as Lectionary 76a (Gregory).

Description 

The codex contains Lessons from the Acts, Catholic, and Pauline epistles lectionary (Apostolarion), on 113 paper leaves (24.1 cm by 17.7 cm). It is written in Greek minuscule letters, in two columns per page, 25 lines per page. It is a palimpsest, the lower text is in Arabic.

History 

The manuscript once belonged to Meerman, then to T. Williams, then to Herzog von Sussex. Caspar René Gregory saw the manuscript in 1895.

The manuscript is not cited in the critical editions of the Greek New Testament (UBS3).

Currently the codex is located in the New York Public Library, (Rare Books and Manuscripts Divisions, Ms. 103) at New York City.

See also 

 List of New Testament lectionaries
 Biblical manuscript
 Textual criticism

Notes and references

Bibliography 

 K. W. Clark, A Descriptive Catalogue of Greek New Testament Manuscripts in America, Chicago: The Chicago of University Press, 1937, pp. 142-144. 

Greek New Testament lectionaries
15th-century biblical manuscripts